Indirect presidential elections were held in the unrecognised Republic of Artsakh on 19 July 2017. The incumbent, Bako Sahakyan, was elected to a third term.

Background 
After a constitutional referendum in 2017, the country is transitioning from a semi-presidential system to a presidential system. As a result, presidential elections were delayed until 2020 in order to be held alongside legislative elections. In July 2017, the National Assembly elected the President for the next three years until the general election.

Candidates 
Two candidates were registered.

The Democratic Party of Artsakh nominated the incumbent president Bako Sahakyan. Free Motherland and the Armenian Revolutionary Federation also supported the incumbent.

While, Movement 88 nominated former Stepanakert Mayor Eduard Aghabekyan.

Results 
28 members of National Assembly voted for Bako Sahakyan, 4 of them voted for Eduard Aghabekyan, while one of the MPs abstained.

References

Artsakh
Artsakh
Presidential elections in the Republic of Artsakh
2017 in the Republic of Artsakh